Michael Galen Judd (born June 30, 1975) is an American former professional baseball right-handed pitcher.

Career
Drafted by the New York Yankees in the 9th round of the 1995 Major League Baseball Draft, Judd would make his Major League Baseball debut with the Los Angeles Dodgers on September 28, and appear in his final game on June 12, .

In December 2007, Judd was included in the Mitchell Report in which it was alleged that he used steroids during his career.

See also
 List of Major League Baseball players named in the Mitchell Report

External links

1975 births
Living people
Albuquerque Dukes players
Albuquerque Isotopes players
American expatriate baseball players in Canada
Baseball players from San Diego
Calgary Cannons players
Greensboro Bats players
Grossmont Griffins baseball players
Gulf Coast Yankees players
Los Angeles Dodgers players
Major League Baseball pitchers
Oklahoma RedHawks players
San Antonio Missions players
Savannah Sand Gnats players
Tampa Bay Devil Rays players
Texas Rangers players
Vero Beach Dodgers players